"Sorry" is the 4th single to be taken from the debut album First Comes First by Kingston upon Hull band The Paddingtons. Released on 17 October 2005, it is their 4th single in total, and has been listed for 1 week on the UK Top 40. It entered the chart on position 41.

Released over three formats it featured 3 previously unreleased songs, the details of which are listed below:

Details by format
CD
 "Sorry"
 "All Alone (Live Demo)"

7" 1
A1. "Sorry"
B1. "Mr Cracker"

7" 2
A1. "Sorry"
B1. "Claire My Dear"

2005 singles
The Paddingtons songs
2005 songs